"Magic Moments" is a popular song with music by Burt Bacharach and lyrics by Hal David, one of the first compositions by that duo. The song was published in 1957. The song was recorded by Perry Como as the B-side of his "Catch a Falling Star". It reached No. 1 in the UK in 1958.

Background
In his 2003 book Burt Bacharach, Song by Song, Serene Dominic comments:

Chart performance
The biggest hit version of the song was recorded by Perry Como and released by RCA Victor in December 1957, becoming a hit early in 1958. The record was produced by Joe Reisman. The peak position in the United States is hard to track precisely, due to the multiple charts used in Billboard magazine:  On the Most Played by Disc Jockeys chart, it reached it highest peak of number four. 

The song was also a 1958 hit in Italy, while in the United Kingdom it spent eight weeks at number one in the UK Singles Chart, becoming Como's biggest ever hit there.

In Canada, the song reached number 12 on the CHUM Charts, February 3, 1958, co-charting with Catch a Falling Star.

Other recordings
A less successful UK cover version recorded by Ronnie Hilton reached No. 22 on the UK Singles Chart, in 1958. Hilton's version included some different lyrics than the original.
Bing Crosby recorded the song in 1958 for use on his radio show and it was subsequently included in the album With All My Heart (2012).
Amanda Lear recorded this song for her 1985 EP A L.
Synthpop duo Erasure recorded the song for their 1997 album Cowboy.

Other uses

Magic Moments is also the name given to a Surprise, Surprise style show within the BBC television film Pat and Margaret. Its theme music is the song itself and as the coach carrying various members of the audience sets off at the start of the film, they start singing it.
This song was used in the television commercial for Quality Street, a confectionery brand in the UK in the 1980s and continues to be used each year for the brand's Christmas advertisements. 
The song is also occasionally sung by Ulster Rugby fans at away matches, particularly after 'magic moments' of play.
The Perry Como version is featured in the 1998 film, Fear and Loathing in Las Vegas, when Raoul arrives at a Vegas hotel where Dr. Gonzo is located, briefly in Alex Holeh Ahavah (1986), Dogma (1999), Police Academy (1984), Two Weeks Notice (2002), Bridget Jones: The Edge of Reason (2004), The Hitchhiker's Guide to the Galaxy (2005), Episode 3 of the first season of the 2012 BBC series Call the Midwife, which is set in 1957, and episode 9 of the 2017 Netflix series Glow.
The song was also used as background music for a segment on the 1998 HBO miniseries From the Earth to the Moon featuring a meeting of NASA Astronaut Group 2 – The New Nine – all of whom booked into The Rice Hotel in Houston, Texas, with the code name "Max Peck".
The Erasure recording is featured in the Clive Barker film Lord of Illusions, providing the background music to a magicians' convention.
Song used in the Grupo Arcor commercial in 2020–21. 
The main melody and whistling section was also sampled by rapper Shotgun Willy for his song "Wendy", a love song he wrote about the animated spokeswoman Wendy from Wendy's.

References

Perry Como songs
1957 songs
1958 singles
UK Singles Chart number-one singles
Songs with music by Burt Bacharach
Songs with lyrics by Hal David
1950s jazz standards
Songs about nostalgia